St. Jerome in the Desert or St. Jerome Reading in the Desert is a 1480 oil on panel painting by Giovanni Bellini, now in the Uffizi Gallery in Florence as part of the Contini Bonacossi collection, giving it its alternative title of The Contini Bonacossi St. Jerome.

Its original location is unknown, though Gamba's theory is that it was an altarpiece for Santa Maria dei Miracoli, Venice, where Jacopo Sansovino mentioned seeing a St. Jerome by Bellini completed in 1489. It uses the same composition as another St. Jerome in the Desert, controversially dated to around 1505. In both works saint Jerome is shown reading in the desert, referring to both his life as a hermit and his production of the Vulgate Bible.

The Florence work shows a crucifix on a tall stick, which he used as a prayer aid. His usual lion is shown, as are some birds, a lizard, a squirrel on a branch and one deer chasing another, all of which probably had symbolic meanings. At the top is a rural background with a fortress and a walled city full of guard towers and bell towers, along with other buildings based on famous buildings in Romagna and Venetia which Bellini had seen on his journey to Romagna and the Marche. The central building resembles the Basilica of San Vitale in Ravenna, whilst others are based on the Ponte di Tiberio in Rimini and the Mausoleum of Theoderic in Ravenna. The marked the start of a new conception of landscape painting, connected to the predella of the Pesaro Altarpiece or the New York St. Francis in Ecstasy, whose figures and background are lighter and whose atmosphere is freer than previous works.

References

Paintings by Giovanni Bellini
Paintings in the collection of the Uffizi
1480 paintings
Books in art
Lions in art
Bellini